Dalston Kingsland railway station is a railway station on the North London Line in London, England. It is in the Dalston area of the London Borough of Hackney, on the western side of Kingsland High Street and opposite Ridley Road Market. The station and all trains serving it are operated by London Overground. It is in Travelcard Zone 2. Kingsland railway station was first opened on the site in 1850, but was replaced by Dalston Junction in 1865. The current station was opened by British Rail in 1983. Ticket barriers are in operation. The station straddles the boundary with the London Borough of Islington, with part of the platforms falling within Islington.

History
A station was first opened on the site on 9 November 1850 by the North London Railway. It closed on 1 November 1865 when an extension was built to Broad Street in the City of London and a triangular junction was installed which joined the existing tracks to the east and west of the station. A new Dalston Junction station was opened at the southern tip of the junction and it replaced Kingsland station. The station was rebuilt and reopened on 16 May 1983 as part of the Crosstown Linkline service. The station replaced Dalston Junction when it closed in 1986, along with the rest of the line to Broad Street.

Present day
Dalston Junction reopened on 27 April 2010 on the London Overground East London Line extension, with interchange permitted between it and Dalston Kingsland. The western curve of the junction was relaid for the East London Line going to Highbury & Islington station; the site of the eastern curve is covered by the car park of Kingsland shopping centre.

As part of TfL's Overground improvement programme, plans have been approved to redevelop the station. Aside from increasing the number of entry and exit gates, the changes are largely cosmetic and do not make any provision for step-free access.

Plans have been approved to redevelop the "Peacocks" building immediately adjacent to the station into a 15-storey tower block.

Services
The closure was to enable the installation of a new signalling system and the extension of 30 platforms. Engineering work continued until May 2011, during which reduced services operated and Sunday services were suspended.

However, service intervals vary from about seven minutes during peak times to 30 minutes on Sundays.

At Dalston Kingsland station the NLL was powered by both 25 kV overhead AC and 750 V third-rail DC systems and was the change-over point between current collection by pantographs and by shoes for passenger trains that are dual-system Class 378 electric multiple units (EMUs). For reliability, time-saving, and as part of the NLL upgrade, the third rail has now been removed and overhead cables power the North London Line between Stratford and Acton Central.

In August 2002 a potentially serious railway accident was avoided near Dalston Kingsland when a passenger train was inadvertently diverted on to the goods line during emergency signalling. When the passenger train was reversing to its correct path a following goods train almost ran into it.

Connections
London Buses routes 67, 76, 149, 243 and 488 serve the station.

References

External links

 Excel file displaying National Rail station usage information for 2005/06 

Railway stations in the London Borough of Hackney
Former North London Railway stations
Railway stations in Great Britain opened in 1850
Railway stations in Great Britain closed in 1865
Railway stations in Great Britain opened in 1983
Reopened railway stations in Great Britain
Railway stations served by London Overground
Dalston